Enes Ünal (born 10 May 1997) is a Turkish professional footballer who plays as a forward for Spanish club Getafe and the Turkey national team.

Ünal scored on his Süper Lig debut on 25 August 2013 for Bursaspor against Galatasaray, making him the youngest player to net in Turkey's top division. An international at several youth levels, he earned his first senior cap on 31 March 2015 in a friendly against Luxembourg.

Club career

Bursaspor
Ünal was born in Osmangazi in Bursa, and was promoted from the Bursaspor youth team. He made his professional debut against FK Vojvodina in the first leg of third qualifying round of 2013–14 UEFA Europa League on 1 August 2013, replacing Sebastián Pinto for the last five minutes of a 2–2 draw at Karađorđe.

On 25 August 2013, Ünal came off the bench for Ferhat Kiraz in the 71st minute to make his debut against Galatasaray, and scored his first league goal three minutes later with the assist by Pablo Batalla. This goal made him the youngest player to score in the Süper Lig. On 21 October, he scored his second league goal against Kayserispor with the assist by Şener Özbayraklı. On 19 December 2013, he came off the bench for Musa Çağıran in the 80th minute in the Turkish Cup game against İnegölspor, and scored Bursaspor's second goal via a free kick two minutes later, netting the third in the 86th minute. On 12 February 2014, he scored the third goal for Bursaspor against Akhisar Belediyespor in the cup group stages. They finished first in the group stage with 13 points and advanced to the semi-finals to face Galatasaray.

Manchester City
On 7 July 2015, English Premier League club Manchester City announced Ünal's signing for a reported fee of £2 million, their first purchase of the summer. He made his debut against Adelaide United on a tour of Australia, in a 2–0 win.

On 31 July 2015, Manchester City announced that Ünal would be going out on loan to Belgian Pro League side Genk for two seasons. On 29 January 2016, his agreement was cancelled, and he returned to Manchester City.

On 1 February 2016, Ünal was loaned to Dutch club NAC Breda until end of the season; eighteen days later he scored on his debut against Fortuna Sittard. He scored his first career hat-trick on 11 April 2016 in a game against SC Telstar.

On 23 July 2016, Ünal was loaned to Dutch club FC Twente for the 2016–17 season. On 21 August, he made his first start, scoring his second career hat-trick. He scored two more goals in his next game for the club, a 4–1 win over ADO Den Haag.

Villarreal
On 30 May 2017, Ünal joined La Liga side Villarreal for £12 million with a buy back option for Manchester City. He made his debut in the season opener, a 1–0 loss to Levante on 21 August. His first goal came on 10 September in a 3–1 win over Real Betis.

On 30 October 2017, Ünal joined Levante on an emergency loan deal until June 2018, with the option of a call back in January. He scored on his debut against Girona, on 5 November 2017, though the match ended in a 2–1 loss.

On 26 December 2017, Villarreal exercised the call back option and Ünal rejoined the club three days later. The following 19 August, he joined newly-promoted side Real Valladolid on a one-year loan deal. In 2019 July, his loan contract was extended until the end of 2019–20 season.

Getafe
On 12 August 2020, Getafe announced the signing of Ünal from Villarreal on a five-year contract.

International career
After scoring 25 goals in 24 games for the Turkey U16 side, he was quickly promoted to the U17s, and after scoring his first professional goal in 2013 was invited to join the Turkey U21 side, despite being just 16 years old. He scored his first U21 goal in 4–0 win against Malta.

Ünal earned his first international cap at senior level on 31 March 2015, replacing Olcay Şahan in the 57th minute of at a 2–1 friendly victory against Luxembourg at the Stade Josy Barthel. His second cap wouldn't come for over a year, appearing as a substitute in a friendly against Russia on 31 August 2016.

On 30 September 2016, Ünal was called up for 2018 World Cup qualification matches against Ukraine and Iceland. He made his first start and competitive debut for Turkey against Ukraine, on 6 October, in a 2–2 draw. On 17 November 2019, Ünal scored his first two goals for Turkey in a 2–0 win against Andorra, during the UEFA Euro 2020 qualification.

Personal life
Ünal's father, Mesut Ünal, was also a professional footballer who also played for Bursaspor and was a youth international for Turkey.

Ünal's family became Manchester City fans after Sergio Aguero's 94th minute Premier League title winner in 2012.

He had been dating Lisa Smellers, a Belgian footballer who plays for KRC Genk Ladies. The couple got married in December 2019.

Career statistics

Club

International

Scores and results list Turkey's goal tally first, score column indicates score after each Ünal goal.

References

External links

Profile at the Getafe CF website
 
 
 
 

1997 births
Living people
People from Osmangazi
Turkish footballers
Association football forwards
Turkey international footballers
Turkey under-21 international footballers
Turkey youth international footballers
UEFA Euro 2020 players
Süper Lig players
Belgian Pro League players
Eredivisie players
Eerste Divisie players
La Liga players
Bursaspor footballers
Manchester City F.C. players
K.R.C. Genk players
NAC Breda players
Villarreal CF players
Levante UD footballers
Real Valladolid players
Getafe CF footballers
Turkish expatriate footballers
Turkish expatriate sportspeople in England
Expatriate footballers in England
Turkish expatriate sportspeople in Belgium
Expatriate footballers in Belgium
Turkish expatriate sportspeople in the Netherlands
Expatriate footballers in the Netherlands
Turkish expatriate sportspeople in Spain
Expatriate footballers in Spain